Decadent is the 15th studio album by German heavy metal band U.D.O. It was released on 23 January 2015 in Europe and 3 February 2015 in the United States through AFM Records. On 12 December 2014, "Decadent" was released as the first single. It is the last album to feature drummer Francesco Jovino as well as guitarist Kasperi Heikkinen.

Reception

Jimmy Martin of Terrorizer gave the album a moderate rating, and wrote, "True to form, 'Decadent' [...] is chock full of the man's trademark bluster, which has essentially remained stylistically frozen in 'Metal Heart'/'Screaming For Vengeance' formation. [...] Gloriously oblivious to all or any developments elsewhere in metal, 'Decadent' [...] is possessed of a vim, vigour and strident joie-de-vivre that proves very hard to resist."

Track listing

Personnel 
 Udo Dirkschneider: vocals
 Andrey Smirnov: guitars
 Kasperi Heikkinen: guitars
 Fitty Wienhold: bass
 Francesco Jovino: drums

Guest musicians
 Ingmar Viertel: backing vocals
 Claus Rettkowski: backing vocals

Production
 Jacob Hansen: mastering
 Martin Häusler: photography
 Dirk Hüttner: cover art
 Hiko: Design, layout
 Holger Thielbörger: editing
 Fitty Wienhold: producer
 Udo Dirkschneider: producer
 Mattes: producer, mixing

References 

U.D.O. albums
2015 albums